Paranormal Action Squad is an adult comedy animated streaming television series from YouTube Premium starring the YouTubers SeaNanners, Mr. Sark, and VanossGaming, while YouTubers TheSyndicateProject and H2O Delirious appear in guest starring roles. It is the first original animated series launched by YouTube.

Cast
 Adam Montoya as Paul
 Scott Robison as Eddie
 Nika Futterman as Pad
 Toks Olagundoye as Orb
 Evan Fong as himself
Mr. Sark as Vanoss's father

Episodes

Season 1 (2016)

Reception
The show received mixed reaction from critics and fans.

John Schwarz of Bubbleblabber wrote that the voice actors had done their parts well, but he said that the overall premise went wrong. He also praised the overall aesthetic of the show and believed the show to be a good start for YouTube Red. The show was rated in his review 7/10.

References

YouTube Premium original series
2016 web series debuts
2010s American adult animated television series
American adult animated comedy television series
American adult animated web series
American comedy web series
Zombie web series